The professional world rankings for snooker players in the 1994–1995 season are listed below.

Stephen Hendry retained the top ranking for the fifth consecutive year. It was the first season in the elite "top 16" for Ronnie O'Sullivan, Peter Ebdon, Tony Drago and Joe Swail. Dennis Taylor was not amongst the top 16, for the first time since 1978.

References

1994
Rankings 1995
Rankings 1994